Moeko (written: ,  or  in hiragana) is a feminine Japanese given name. People with this name include:

, Japanese singer and actress
, Japanese professional wrestler who formerly used the stage name 
, Japanese ice hockey forward
, Japanese basketball player
Moeko Rakuyona, character in Yandere Simulator

Japanese feminine given names